The Luxembourg national under-19 football team is the national under-19 football team of Luxembourg and is controlled by the Luxembourg Football Federation. The team competes in the UEFA European Under-19 Football Championship, held every year.

Players

Latest squad

See also 
 Luxembourg national football team
 Luxembourg national under-21 football team

References

Under-19
European national under-19 association football teams